Crawford County is a county located in the central portion of the U.S. state of Georgia. As of the 2020 census, the population was 12,130. The county seat is Knoxville.

Crawford County is included in the Macon, GA Metropolitan Statistical Area.

History

Crawford County, in west central Georgia, is Georgia's fifty-seventh county. The  county was created on December 9, 1822, from Houston County, which had been formed from land given up by the Creek Indians in the 1821 Treaty of Indian Springs. The county is named for statesman William H. Crawford who had served as a U.S. senator, minister to France, and secretary of the treasury.

The first white settlers in the area were Indian agent Benjamin Hawkins. Arriving in 1803, he developed a five-square-mile compound on the Flint River, with slave labor. The compound included a shop and plantation, which became known as the Creek Agency Reserve. Although Hawkins was well liked by the Creeks, he believed, as did many white men of his time, that the Indians should embrace a European-American way of life. His efforts to persuade the Creeks, however, were largely unsuccessful. Hawkins died at the reserve in 1816.  David B. Mitchell was appointed in 1817 to replace the deceased Hawkins.

Knoxville, Georgia was established on the Federal Road, the main stagecoach route from Washington, D.C., to New Orleans, making the town a natural choice for county seat. Although the chief center of population is now Roberta, a mile to its west, Knoxville (no longer an incorporated city) retains its designation as the county seat. The current courthouse, built there in 2002, replaced one built in 1851, which still stands. The Old Courthouse is designated as a historical site and is used as a museum.

Roberta, originally called New Knoxville, is the only incorporated city in the county. It was incorporated on December 26, 1890. Roberta started out in 1886 as a railroad office and warehouse, "Roberta, ca. 1900," at the Atlanta and Florida Railway's "89 Fort Valley" milepost. Two years later, after a freight depot and passenger station were completed at the site, people began to settle in the immediate area. Townspeople gave the honor of naming the new town to Hiram McCrary, who had given the railroad the rights to come through his land. McCrary chose to call it Roberta in honor of his young daughter.

Most of the inhabitants of Knoxville, a mile away, moved to Roberta when the railroad arrived. For years, while passenger train service was an important mode of transportation, Roberta served as a thriving tourist stop on the route to Florida. After passenger train service gave way to the private automobile, Roberta relaxed into a quiet residential town. The rail tracks were taken up during the 1980s and only the rail bed remains. During 1950 through 1965 the tourist industry was revived by tourist traveling to and from coastal resorts by way of Highway US 341. This all ended when the interstate system diverted traffic away from Roberta to Macon, Georgia. The many diners and motels built to meet the tourist needs all but disappeared. Roberta is now a quiet, small Southern town. Other communities in Crawford county are Musella, Gaillard, Horns, Lee Pope, and Zenith.

Musella officially first appeared on the Georgia map in 1895. It appears that the Atlanta and Florida Railway (A&F) named the community Musella to identify it as a flag stop. The A&F began laying  of track from Atlanta to Fort Valley in 1880. The railroad wanted to bring the track from Culloden to Knoxville, which was the most direct and economical route, but Crawford County rebelled. Crawford Countians didn't want the railroad passing through their county seat, so, the A&F laid the tracks to Musella instead. When Musella became a flag stop, the railroad offered better opportunities for farmers to market their products, so many of the residents of nearby Ceres, Georgia, (named after the Roman goddess of agriculture; settlement also called Hopewell) migrated to Musella. Since cotton could be shipped by rail, the cotton gin at Ceres was disassembled and moved approximately two miles to Musella. Soon, a general store and post office were built there, and Musella quickly became a hub of economic activity in northern Crawford County. Now it is a snapshot of the past.

During the county's early days, settlers relied first on agriculture (cotton and oats) then on cattle ranching, timber harvesting, and sand extraction as economic mainstays. Agriculture continues to be important, as are manufacturing and health and social services. Many residents also work in neighboring areas.

Well-known figures from Crawford County include Jefferson Franklin Long, Georgia's first African-American congressional representative and the first African American to speak from the floor of the U.S. House of Representatives. Long, of mixed African and Caucasian ancestry, was born into slavery in Knoxville. As a freedman after the Civil War (1861–65), he became a tailor. His interest in equal rights led him to politics. He was elected to Congress in December 1870 and served until March 1871 during the Reconstruction era.

John Pemberton, the inventor of Coca-Cola, was also born in Knoxville. Pemberton was a veteran Confederate States of America lieutenant colonel who served on the first Georgia pharmacy licensing board after the war. His state-of-the-art laboratory for chemical analysis and manufacturing became the first state-run facility to conduct tests of soil and crop chemicals.

Joanna Troutman, who designed the first Lone Star flag (later adopted as the Texas State Flag), was born in Crawford County. She presented her flag to a Volunteer Georgia Battalion, who went to Texas in 1835 to assist Texans in their fight for independence. The flag was first flown at Velasco January 8, 1836, and was hoisted along with the Bloody Arm flag at Goliad on news of the declaration of independence March 8, 1836. Although Troutman lived most of her life in Knoxville, her remains were moved to the Texas State Cemetery in Austin, where a bronze statue was erected in her honor. A portrait of Troutman also hangs in the Texas State Capitol.

In 1775 naturalist William Bartram, traveling across Georgia, found a previously unknown plant in Crawford County. He named the plant Hydrangea Quercifolia—now commonly called Oakleaf Hydrangea. Bartram described the area near Sweetwater Creek as a "delightful diversified rural scene," noting that it "promises a happy, fruitful and salubrious region." See The Botanical Explorations of William Bartram in the Southeast by David H. Rembert Jr., Department of Biology, University of South Carolina—article and picture courtesy of Bartram Trail Conference.

Crawford County pottery was a thriving business in Crawford County during the 1800s and early 1900s. Men such as Long, Becham, Merritt, Pyles, and Dickson were known throughout the area for their utilitarian jugs and crocks. Clay from Crawford County and the Rich Hill alkaline glaze used by the early "jug makers" is still prized today.

Historic places to visit:
 Knoxville: The Old Jail (Est 1843) Museum and the Old Courthouse (Est 1832), which was re-built in 1851 after a fire, houses documents and local history. Knoxville is also the home of the annual Crawford County Pottery Jug Fest.
 Roberta: Historic Old Town Buildings, Replica of the original Train Depot and Passenger Station, Bejamin Hawkins Monument. Currently renovating a rail car Caboose for a railway Museum.
 West of Roberta off Highway US 80: The Museum of Southeastern Indians with its collection of Indian artifacts and Appalachian settler history.
 Musella: Dickey Farms (Est. 1897) has one of Georgia's oldest, continuously operating peach packing houses (built in 1936). Hays General Store (Est. 1900) has 110 years of continuous operation, and is one of the oldest stores of its kind in Georgia still in operation.  Musella Baptist Church was founded in 1884; the current building was constructed in 1908, and is a beautiful example of traditional country church architecture.

Geography

The fall line of the eastern United States roughly bisects the county, meaning that northern portions of the county are generally hillier than southern portions of the county, which tend to be flatter and have a lot of farmland and agriculture. The Fall Line Freeway runs across a very small portion of the southern part of the county along Georgia State Route 96.

The western portion of Crawford County, west of Musella and Knoxville, is located in the Upper Flint River sub-basin of the ACF River Basin (Apalachicola-Chattahoochee-Flint River Basin). The northeastern portion of the county, northeast of Byron, is located in the Upper Ocmulgee River sub-basin of the Altamaha River basin. A southeastern corner of Crawford County, north of Fort Valley, is located in the Lower  Ocmulgee River sub-basin of the same Altamaha River basin.

Major highways

  Interstate 75
  U.S. Route 80
  U.S. Route 341
  State Route 7
  State Route 22
  State Route 42
  State Route 96
  State Route 128
  State Route 401
  State Route 540 (Fall Line Freeway)

Adjacent counties
 Monroe County – north
 Bibb County – east-northeast
 Peach County – east-southeast
 Taylor County – southwest
 Macon County – south
 Upson County – northwest
 Houston County- Extreme East at Echeconee Creek

Demographics

2000 census
As of the census of 2000, there were 12,495 people, 4,461 households, and 3,457 families living in the county. There were 4,872 housing units at an average density of 15 per square mile (6/km2). The racial makeup of the county was 72.85% White, 23.80% Black or African American, 0.37% Native American, 0.17% Asian, 0.02% Pacific Islander, 1.81% from other races, and 0.98% from two or more races.  2.41% of the population were Hispanic or Latino of any race.

There were 4,461 households, out of which 37.50% had children under the age of 18 living with them, 60.50% were married couples living together, 12.60% had a female householder with no husband present, and 22.50% were non-families. 18.80% of all households were made up of individuals, and 6.30% had someone living alone who was 65 years of age or older.  The average household size was 2.78 and the average family size was 3.14.

In the county, the population was spread out, with 27.60% under the age of 18, 7.90% from 18 to 24, 31.60% from 25 to 44, 23.70% from 45 to 64, and 9.20% who were 65 years of age or older.  The median age was 35 years. For every 100 females, there were 100.50 males.  For every 100 females age 18 and over, there were 97.60 males.

The median income for a household in the county was $37,848, and the median income for a family was $41,799. Males had a median income of $31,099 versus $21,138 for females. The per capita income for the county was $15,768.  About 12.70% of families and 15.40% of the population were below the poverty line, including 17.20% of those under age 18 and 23.80% of those age 65 or over.

2010 census
As of the 2010 United States Census, there were 12,630 people, 4,822 households, and 3,531 families living in the county. The racial makeup of the county was 74.6% white, 22.3% black or African American, 0.5% American Indian, 0.3% Asian, 0.1% Pacific islander, 1.0% from other races, and 1.3% from two or more races. Those of Hispanic or Latino origin made up 2.4% of the population. In terms of ancestry, 12.0% were American, 9.9% were English, 9.8% were Irish, and 7.3% were German.

Of the 4,822 households, 32.3% had children under the age of 18 living with them, 54.9% were married couples living together, 13.3% had a female householder with no husband present, 26.8% were non-families, and 22.2% of all households were made up of individuals. The average household size was 2.59 and the average family size was 3.02. The median age was 41.5 years.

The median income for a household in the county was $37,062 and the median income for a family was $48,623. Males had a median income of $39,452 versus $34,167 for females. The per capita income for the county was $20,692. About 16.8% of families and 20.5% of the population were below the poverty line, including 32.8% of those under age 18 and 16.2% of those age 65 or over.

2020 census

As of the 2020 United States census, there were 12,130 people, 4,510 households, and 3,122 families residing in the county.

Education

Communities

City
 Roberta

Census-designated place
 Knoxville

Unincorporated communities
 Lizella
 Musella
 Zenith

Politics

See also

 National Register of Historic Places listings in Crawford County, Georgia
List of counties in Georgia

References

External links
 Georgia.gov history of Crawford County
 GeorgiInfo history of the Crawford County courthouse
 
 
 More Information: 
 Crawford County historical marker

 
1822 establishments in Georgia (U.S. state)
Populated places established in 1822
Georgia (U.S. state) counties
Macon metropolitan area, Georgia